Felix Oberholzer-Gee is a Swiss academic. He is the Andreas Andresen Professor of Business Administration in the Strategy Unit at Harvard Business School. A member of the faculty since 2003, Professor Oberholzer-Gee received his master's degree, summa cum laude, and his Ph.D. in Economics from the University of Zurich.

File sharing 
Oberholzer-Gee and Koleman Strumpf wrote The effect of file sharing on record sales: An empirical analysis, which was published in 2007; and in 2008 was cited during the Pirate Bay trial.

Their analysis indicated that file-sharing of music had negligible impact on CD sales, though this has been disputed by the recording industry and other  researchers.
However these critiques were never peer reviewed (unlike the original paper) and the authors have received significant funding from the record industry.

References

Further reading 
 Oberholzer-Gee, Felix & Strumpf, Koleman (March 2004).  "The effect of file sharing on record sales: An empirical analysis "
 Liebowitz, Stan J. (Sept 2016). "Why the  Oberholzer-Gee and Strumpf Paper on File-Sharing is not credible"
 Liebowitz, Stan J. (May 2017). "Responding to Oberholzer-Gee and Strumpf’s Attempted Defense of Their Piracy Paper"
 Liebowitz, Stan J. (May 18, 2017). "A Replication of Four Quasi-Experiments and Three Facts from ‘The Effect of File Sharing on Record Sales: An Empirical Analysis’ (Journal of Political Economy, 2007)"
  Felix Oberholzer-Gee had a conversation with Rishabh Chaddha (Contributor) about his book "Better, Simpler Strategy"  and its writing process. 

Living people
Year of birth missing (living people)
University of Zurich alumni
Swiss emigrants to the United States
Harvard Business School faculty